A number of vessels of the People’s Liberation Army Navy have borne the name Nanchang, after the capital Nanchang.

 , in service 1982–2016. Now a Museum ship in Nanchang.
 , a Type 055 destroyer, in service since 2020.

References 

People's Liberation Army Navy ship names